The men's sanda (as Sanshou) 60 kg at the 2006 Asian Games in Doha, Qatar was held from 11 to 14 December at the Aspire Hall 3 in Aspire Zone.

Schedule
All times are Arabia Standard Time (UTC+03:00)

Results
Legend
KO — Won by knockout

Final

Top half

Bottom half

References

Results

External links
Official website

Men's sanda 60 kg